The Gainesville Owls were a Big State League (1947–1951) and Sooner State League (1953–1955) baseball team based in Gainesville, Texas, United States. They were affiliated with the Chicago Cubs from 1953 to 1955. Their home games were played at Locke Field.

During the 1955 season, they moved to Ponca City, Oklahoma to become the Ponca City Cubs.

They won one league championship, in 1951 under manager Hal Van Pelt.

References

Defunct minor league baseball teams
Baseball teams established in 1947
Gainesville, Texas
Chicago Cubs minor league affiliates
Professional baseball teams in Texas
Defunct baseball teams in Texas
Baseball teams disestablished in 1955
1955 disestablishments in Texas
1947 establishments in Texas
Defunct Big State League teams
Defunct baseball teams in Oklahoma